AROS Research Operating System (AROS, pronounced "AR-OS") is a free and open-source multi media centric implementation of the AmigaOS 3.1 application programming interface (API). Designed to be portable and flexible. , ports are available for personal computers (PCs) based on x86 and PowerPC, in native and hosted flavors, with other architectures in development. In a show of full circle development, AROS has been ported to the Motorola 68000 series (m68k) based Amiga 1200, and there is also an ARM port for the Raspberry Pi series.

Name and identity 

AROS originally stood for Amiga Research Operating System, but to avoid any trademark issues with the Amiga name, it was changed to the recursive acronym AROS Research Operating System.

The mascot of AROS is an anthropomorphic cat named Kitty, created by Eric Schwartz and officially adopted by the AROS Team in December 2002.

Used in the core AROS About and installer tools, it was also adopted by several AROS community sites and early distributions.

Other AROS identifiable symbols and logos are based around the cat shape, such as the Icaros logo, which is a stylised cat's eye, or AFA (Aros For Amiga).

Current status 

The project, begun in 1995, has over the years become an almost "feature complete" implementation of AmigaOS which, as of May 2017, only lacks a few areas of functionality. This was achieved by the efforts of a small team of developers.

It can be installed on most IBM PC compatibles, and features native graphics drivers for video cards such as the GeForce range made by Nvidia. As of May 2007 USB keyboards and mice are also supported. AROS has been ported to the Sam440ep PowerPC board and a first test version for the Efika was released in 2009.

While the OS is still lacking in applications, a few have been ported, including E-UAE, an emulation program that allows m68k-native AmigaOS applications to run. Some AROS-specific applications have also been written. AROS has TCP/IP networking support, and has available an experimental version of AMosaic web browser, for test purposes, among other Internet-related applications. The Poseidon USB stack has been ported to AROS.

AROS is designed to be source-compatible with AmigaOS. On m68k Amiga hardware it is also binary-compatible, so binaries already compiled for AmigaOS 3 can be run on AROS. On x86 IA-32 32-bit platforms Janus-UAE, an enhanced E-UAE, integrates Amiga emulation directly into AROS to run AmigaOS m68k binaries nearly transparent to the user. , original AmigaOS 3 operating system files are needed for the emulation.

The aim of AROS is to remain aloof of the legal and political spats that have plagued other AmigaOS implementations by being independent of hardware and of any central control. The de facto motto of AROS, "No schedule and rocking" both lampoons the infamous words "On Schedule and Rockin" from Amiga, Inc. CEO Bill McEwen, and declares a lack of the formal deadlines.

A workable AmigaOS Kickstart clone for the Motorola 68000 processor was released on March 31, 2011 as part of a programming bounty. The memory requirement is 2 MB Chip RAM and 1 MB Fast RAM. This software is a complete free open-source alternative to AmigaOS.

Distributions 
The main AROS system files can be downloaded in many flavors from the project website. These files are compiled straight from the SVN source tree at night time, and are available as nightly builds. Nightlies also include some third party applications to allow people using the system to perform some very basic tasks.

For final/average user, like Linux, there are several distributions available:

Icaros Desktop 
Since April 2009, the name VMWAros has been changed into "Icaros Desktop" to avoid ambiguities with any existing copyrighted Virtual Machine of any kind. Amiga 68K emulation integration, 3D acceleration for Nvidia cards and latest updates of applications can be found there. The latest version of Icaros Desktop is version 2.3 (released 22 December, 2020).

Broadway 
Broadway is a distribution of AROS begun late 2009. The goal has been to provide a simple and complete introduction to what AROS has to offer. Also added was commercial software like a media center, a cloud storage service, and an appstore. Last version is 1.0 preview 5, released April 16, 2016.

AspireOS 
AspireOS is a distribution, begun in 2011, by Nikos Tomatsidis, which is focused on Dell Latitude D520 and Acer Aspire One 110, 150 computers. Latest version is 2.2, codenamed "Obitus", released November 2018.

AROS Vision 
AROS Vision is a native m68k distribution, which can run on both real hardware or in emulators like UAE.

Apollo OS 
ApolloOS is an active m68k distribution, crafted specially for the Vampire V4 Standalone FPGA-based system.

Influence on AmigaOS and MorphOS 
Haage & Partner used little parts of AROS source code for AmigaOS 3.5 and 3.9.
Large parts of MorphOS (AmigaDOS, Intuition and more) have been ported from AROS.

System requirements

x86 
 CPU, newer than Intel 80486 (recommended minimum clockspeed of 700 MHz for desktops and 1 GHz for laptops/notebooks/netbooks)
 Floating Point Unit (FPU)
 256 MB RAM

See also 

 Zune (GUI toolkit)
 AmigaOS 4
 Emulator
 Virtual machine
 Porting
 Open-source software
 MorphOS
 List of computing mascots
 :Category:Computing mascots

References

External links 

 
 Icaros Desktop
 AROS Broadway
 AEROS
 AspireOS
 Wikibooks Hardware Compatibility
 Old AROS Bootable CD screenshots
 sourceforge.net – AROS download

1996 software

Free software operating systems
Hobbyist operating systems
Microkernel-based operating systems
Microkernels
PowerPC operating systems
Window-based operating systems
X86 operating systems